Ondra may refer to:

Adam Ondra (born 1993), Czech rock climber
Anny Ondra (1903–1987), Czech film actress
Jiří Ondra (born 1957), Czech soccer player
Óndra Łysohorsky (1905-1989), Czech poet
Tesla ONDRA, home computer from 1985 developed in Elstroj, produced by Tesla Liberec and later Tesla Blatna